Tommy Mikael Salo (born February 1, 1971) is a Swedish former professional ice hockey goaltender and the current general manager of Leksands IF of the Swedish Hockey League (SHL). He previously played in the National Hockey League (NHL) for the New York Islanders, Edmonton Oilers and Colorado Avalanche, and previously served as head coach of IK Oskarshamn.

Playing career
Salo began his career playing three seasons in the Elitserien with Västerås IK.  He was chosen 118th overall, in the fifth round, by the New York Islanders in 1993.  He debuted with the Islanders in 1994–95, but would play the majority of his first two seasons in North America with New York's International Hockey League (IHL) affiliate, the Utah Grizzlies.  Playing in the IHL, Salo won back-to-back Turner Cups with the Grizzlies as league champions and earned the N.R. "Bud" Poile Trophy as playoff MVP in 1996. In his first year, he was named both league MVP and rookie of the year in 1995, in addition to First Team All-Star honours and a James Norris Memorial Trophy for allowing the fewest goals against.

In 1996–97, Salo emerged as the Islanders' starting goaltender and played in that capacity for the club until March 20, 1999, when he was traded to the Edmonton Oilers in exchange for Mats Lindgren and an eighth-round pick in the 1999 NHL Entry Draft (used to select Radek Martínek). Salo found his stride in Edmonton and was chosen to two All-Star Games in 2000 and 2002. In 2001–02, Salo recorded a career-best 2.22 goals against average (GAA).

On March 9, 2004, after six seasons with Edmonton, Salo was traded to the Colorado Avalanche (along with a sixth-round pick in the 2004 NHL Entry Draft) in exchange for Tom Gilbert.  As NHL play was suspended the following season due to the 2004–05 NHL lockout, Salo returned to Sweden in signing a one-year contract with Modo Hockey of the Elitserien.

After Modo was eliminated in the playoffs by Färjestad BK, Salo announced his retirement from professional hockey on March 17, 2005, citing chronic hip pain. However, on August 4, he returned to the Elitserien to sign with Frölunda HC. This led to a conflict with Modo since they had agreed to terminate his contract on account of his retirement. In light of this, the club appealed for Frölunda to pay Salo's salary. On August 11, the issue was settled after Modo withdrew their claim. By signing with Frölunda, Salo replaced the departing Henrik Lundqvist, who incidentally, had taken over Salo's starting position on the Swedish national team.

On December 9, 2006, in an interview with Swedish newspaper Expressen, Salo announced that he would retire from playing professional hockey after the 2006–07 season.

International play
Salo first competed for Sweden in the 1991 World Junior Championships. He played in six games and posted a 3.32 GAA.

Several years later, he played an integral role in Sweden's gold medal victory at the 1994 Winter Olympics in Lillehammer, Norway. Salo made critical saves in the gold medal game, as they defeated Canada in a shootout to secure Sweden's first Olympic gold medal in ice hockey.

In 1998, Salo once again competed in the Winter Olympics, as NHL players were allowed to compete for the first time. He played in four games as Sweden failed to medal.

At the 2002 Winter Olympics, Salo started for Sweden once more and were favourites to win the gold medal, placing first in the round robin. However, in the quarter-final game against Belarus, with the game tied late in the third period, Salo surrendered a 20-metre goal from defenceman Vladimir Kopat. The long slap shot puck bounced off Salo's mask after he had hopped, went up in the air, and bounced off of his back and into the net. Sweden would not recover and Salo was made the scapegoat in one of the biggest upsets in international hockey history. Sweden captain Mats Sundin berated fans and media for singling-out Salo, saying that "the entire team played subpar, a single fluke goal shouldn't cost us the game". Some would claim that Salo was never the same after the incident.

Coaching and executive career 
Shortly after completing his playing career, on March 5, 2007, Kungälvs IK of the Swedish tier III league announced that Salo would be their head coach for the next two seasons. Following his tenure with the club, he signed with IK Oskarshamn on March 12, 2009.

On December 1, 2010, Salo left his post at IK Oskarshamn to become general manager of Leksands IF.

Legal issues

On 11 August 2020, Salo crashed his car into the middle railing on the E18 highway, east of Köping, Sweden. Police arrived to the scene and found Salo sleeping in his car. A blood sample showed that Salo was heavily intoxicated with 3.06 ‰ alcohol in his blood stream. On 20 January 2021, Salo was convicted for aggravated drunken driving and sentenced to two months in prison.

Career statistics

Regular season and playoffs

International

Awards
International
 Won a Channel One Cup/Izvestia Trophy bronze medal with Sweden in 1993.
 Won a Winter Olympic gold medal with Sweden in 1994.
 Won a World Championships gold medal with Sweden  at the 1998 Men's World Ice Hockey Championships.
 Won a World Championships silver medal with Sweden  at the 1997 Men's World Ice Hockey Championships.
 Won a World Championships bronze medal with Sweden  at the 1994 Men's World Ice Hockey Championships.
 Won a World Championships bronze medal with Sweden  at the 1999 Men's World Ice Hockey Championships.
 Won a World Championships bronze medal with Sweden  at the 2001 Men's World Ice Hockey Championships.
 Won a World Championships bronze medal with Sweden  at the 2002 Men's World Ice Hockey Championships.
 Won a World Championships silver medal with Sweden at the 2003 Men's World Ice Hockey Championships.
 Won a World Cup of Hockey bronze medal with Sweden at the first World Cup of Hockey in 1996.
 IIHF - World Cup's Best Goalkeeper 1997, 1998 , 1999.
 IIHF - The World Championships All Star Team Act 1997, 1998, 1999.
 IIHF - World Cup's best goalkeeper points in 1998 - 95.9
 Swedish All-Star Team 1994, 1996, 1997, 1998, 1999, 2000, 2001, 2002, 2003, 2004.
 Tre Kronor's First Guard 1994-2004.
 All tournaments with Tre Kronor: WJC 1991, IZVESTIA TROPHY/CHANNEL ONE CUP 1993, OS 1994, VM 1994, World Cup of Hockey 1996, VM 1997, OS 1998, VM 1998, VM 1999, VM 2000, VM 2001, OS 2002, VM 2002, VM 2003, World Cup of Hockey 2004.
 Internationals: 112 A , 27 B , 16 C.
 One of his greatest achievements in Tre Kronor was when he made a decisive penalty save in the final against Canada in the 1994 Olympics in Lillehammer, which led to Sweden's first Olympic gold.
 He is also one of the few who received six wasps by the Swedish newspaper Expressen, after holding zero in Sweden's two final matches against Finland in 1998.
 He is the only Swedish goalkeeper to have played in three Olympic tournament series in 1994, 1998, 2002.
IHL
 Won the James Gatschene Memorial Trophy (league MVP) in 1995.
 Won the James Norris Memorial Trophy (fewest goals against) in 1995 and in 1996.
 Won the Gary F. Longman Memorial Trophy (rookie of the year) in 1995.
 Named to the First All-Star Team in 1994 and 1995.
 Won a Turner Cup (league championship) with the Denver Grizzlies in 1995 and Utah Grizzlies in 1996.
 Won the N.R. "Bud" Poile Trophy (Playoff MVP) in 1996.
NHL
 Won the Zane Feldman Trophy–Edmonton Oilers MVP in 1999, 2000, 2001, 2002.
 Ranked third in Edmonton Oilers-Goalies All-Time NHL Leaders Games played - 334 1998–04.
 Ranked third in Edmonton Oilers-Goalies All-Time NHL Win Leaders with - 147 Wins 1998-04.
 Ranked second in Edmonton Oilers-Goalies All-Time NHL Losses Leaders with - 128 Losses 1998-04.
 Ranked third in Edmonton Oilers-Goalies All-Time NHL Leaders Goals Against - 796 1998-04.
 Ranked third in Edmonton Oilers-Goalies All-Time NHL Leaders Shots Against - 8,455 1998-04.
 Ranked third in Edmonton Oilers-Goalies All-Time NHL Leaders Saves - 7,659 1998-04.
 Ranked fourth in Edmonton Oilers-Goalies All-Time NHL Leaders Highest Save Percentage (minimum 2,000 shots) - .906 1998-04.
 Ranked one in Edmonton Oilers-Goalies All-Time NHL Leaders Shutouts - 23 1998-04.
 Ranked third in Edmonton Oilers-Goalies All-Time NHL Leaders Minutes - 19,564 1998-04. 
 Single-season Leaders shutouts in a season: 8, (2000–01) 6, (2001–02) Ranked one and fourth in Edmonton Oilers
 Single-season Leaders Games Played in a season: 73, (2000–01) Ranked second in Edmonton Oilers
 Single-season Leaders Wins in a season: 36, (2000–01) Ranked third in Edmonton Oilers
 Single-season Leaders Lowest Goals Against Average (minimum 2,000 minutes) in a season: 2.22, (2001–02) 2.33, (1999–2000) 2.46, (2000–01) Ranked one and second and fifth in Edmonton Oilers
 Single-season Leaders Minutes in a season: 4,364, (2000–01) 4,164, (1999–2000) Ranked one and fourth in Edmonton Oilers
 All-time post-season Leaders Goaltenders Games played 21, (1998–01 2002–03) Ranked fifth in Edmonton Oilers
 All-time post-season Leaders Goaltenders Losses 16, (1998–01 2002–03) Ranked second in Edmonton Oilers 
 Played in the NHL All-Star Game in 2000 and 2002.
 NHL Career Shutouts - 37.
 Named NHL Player of the Week on March 25, 2002 and March 10, 2003.
 Won the Molson Cup in 1999, 2000, 2001, 2002.
 NHL-drafted By New York Islanders , 5th round, 14th pick, (118th overall)  in NHL Entry Draft 1993.
Elitserien
 Won a silver medal with the Frölunda Indians in 2006.
 Internally voted as the best Frölunda player 2005/2006.
Frölunda HC ECC 2005/2006
 Best goalkeeper Elitserien 1993. 
 Elitserien best goalkeeper Save percentage points 1993 - 91.8 
 Junior 20-SM-Gold 1990.
 TV-Pucken: 1986
 Stora Grabbars Märke number 158. 
 Elected as number 59 in the Swedish Hockey Hall of Fame in 2013.

Records
Edmonton Oilers franchise record; lowest goals against average, career - 2.40 (minimum 4,000 minutes).

References

External links

1971 births
Colorado Avalanche players
Edmonton Oilers players
Frölunda HC players
Ice hockey players at the 1994 Winter Olympics
Ice hockey players at the 1998 Winter Olympics
Ice hockey players at the 2002 Winter Olympics
Living people
Medalists at the 1994 Winter Olympics
Modo Hockey players
National Hockey League All-Stars
New York Islanders draft picks
New York Islanders players
Olympic gold medalists for Sweden
Olympic ice hockey players of Sweden
Olympic medalists in ice hockey
People from Surahammar Municipality
Swedish ice hockey goaltenders
Swedish people of Finnish descent
VIK Västerås HK players
Sportspeople from Västmanland County